was a bureaucrat with the Ministry of Health, Labor, and Welfare and served as a Supreme Court Justice of Japan. She was awarded an Order of the Sacred Treasure, 1st class.

Early life and education 
Takahashi was born in Yokohama on September 21, 1927. She graduated from Ochanomizu University, then studied in Tokyo University's economics department.

Career 
After graduating in 1953, she started working for the Ministry of Health, Labor, and Welfare. She was assigned to the Women's Bureau, where she was chief of employment statistics. She was later reassigned to the Women and Youth Bureau. There she found that women did menial chores in the department, and evidence of other gender discrimintation. This inspired her to advocate for gender equality. Takahashi left public service in 1982.

Takahashi spent the next few years working as the director of the Asian Women’s Interchange Research Forum and the president of the 21st Century Occupational Foundation. She the became the first woman appointed to the Supreme Court of Japan on February 9, 1994 by Prime Minister Morihiro Hosokawa. She did not have a degree in law. Takahashi's term on the Supreme Court ended on September 20, 1997 when she reached the obligatory retirement age of 70.

Takahashi was awarded an Order of the Sacred Treasure in 2000.

She died on December 21, 2013 at 86 years old.

Major Supreme Court cases 

 1995 – Lockheed bribery scandal; apportionment of the 1993 Japanese general election

Selected works

References 

2013 deaths
1927 births
People from Kitakyushu
Ochanomizu University alumni
University of Tokyo alumni
Recipients of the Order of the Sacred Treasure, 1st class
Supreme Court of Japan justices